Malcolm Swift (born 21 April 1974) is a former English cricketer.  Swift was a right-handed batsman who bowled right-arm medium pace.  He was born at Southport, Lancashire.

Swift made his Minor Counties Championship debut for Wiltshire in 1998 against Wales Minor Counties.  He represented the county in one further Championship match against Berkshire, which also came in 1998.  Swift also represented Wiltshire in the MCCA Knockout Trophy.  His debut in that competition came against Herefordshire in 1998.  From 1998 to 1999, he represented the county in 3 further Trophy matches, the last of which came against the Warwickshire Cricket Board.

Swift also represented Wiltshire in a single List A match against Herefordshire in the 1999 NatWest Trophy.  In his only List A match he scored 17 runs.

Swift is still playing cricket, now representing Ainsdale cricket club who play in the Liverpool Competition and are from a village near Southport.

References

External links
Malcolm Swift at Cricinfo
Malcolm Swift at CricketArchive

1974 births
Living people
Sportspeople from Southport
English cricketers
Wiltshire cricketers